Koyna may refer to:

 Koyna River, a river which originates in the Western Ghats of Maharashtra 
 Koyna Wildlife Sanctuary, a wildlife refuge in the Western Ghats of Maharashtra 
 Koynanagar, a town at the site of the Koyna Dam
 Koyna Dam, a dam on Koyna River
 Koyna Hydroelectric Project, hydroelectric project associated with the Koyna River and dam
 Koyna (harvestman), an arachnid genus in the Assamiidae family of harvestman